Youcef Bouzidi (born 19 July 1957) is an Algerian football manager.

References

1957 births
Living people
Algerian football managers
JSM Skikda managers
NA Hussein Dey managers
Olympique de Médéa managers
MO Béjaïa managers
ASO Chlef managers
RC Relizane managers
JS Kabylie managers
USM Bel Abbès managers
Algerian Ligue Professionnelle 1 managers
21st-century Algerian people